Herbst Nunatak (‘Nunatak Herbst’ \'nu-na-tak 'herbst\) is the partly ice-free ridge extending 1.1 km in southeast-northwest direction and 300 m wide, with a central height rising to 846 m and a southern one of 869 m on the southeast side of Sofia University Mountains in northern Alexander Island, Antarctica. It surmounts Poste Valley to the northwest and Nichols Snowfield to the southeast. The vicinity was visited on 2 February 1988 by the geological survey team of Christo Pimpirev and Borislav Kamenov (First Bulgarian Antarctic Expedition), and Philip Nell and Peter Marquis (British Antarctic Survey).

The feature is named after the Bulgarian journalist Yosif Herbst (1875-1925).

Location
British mapping in 1971.

Maps
 British Antarctic Territory. Scale 1:200000 topographic map. DOS 610 – W 69 70. Tolworth, UK, 1971
 Antarctic Digital Database (ADD). Scale 1:250000 topographic map of Antarctica. Scientific Committee on Antarctic Research (SCAR). Since 1993, regularly upgraded and updated

Notes

References
 Bulgarian Antarctic Gazetteer. Antarctic Place-names Commission. (details in Bulgarian, basic data in English)
 Herbst Nunatak. SCAR Composite Gazetteer of Antarctica

External links
 Herbst Nunatak. Copernix satellite image

Mountains of Alexander Island
Bulgaria and the Antarctic